T. erecta may refer to:
 Tagetes erecta, the Mexican marigold, a plant species native to Mexico and Central America
 Thunbergia erecta, a plant species native to western Africa

See also
 Erecta